Benoni may refer to:

Places
 Benoni, Gauteng, a town in the Ekurhuleni Metropolitan Municipality, in the East Rand region of Gauteng province in South Africa
 Benoni, a barangay in Mahinog, Camiguin, Philippines

People
 Benoni (given name), a list of people
 Giuseppe Benoni (1618–1684), Italian architect

Other uses 
 Benoni Premier United, a South African football club
 Benoni Commando, a former light infantry regiment of the South African Army
 Benoni Defense, a chess opening
 Benoni (novel), a 1908 novel by Knut Hamsun
 Benoni, original name of Benjamin, son of Jacob in the Bible

See also
 St. Benoni, Nova Scotia, a community in Canada
 Benoni Rose House, a historic house in Rhode Island, United States